Dudley Lincoln Steinwall (born 9 November 1974) is a Sri Lankan football manager and former footballer who served as head coach of the Sri Lanka national football team. He last played for Negambo Youth as a defender in domestic club football.

Playing career
Steinwall has played club football for Renown, Club Valencia, Blue Star, Negambo Youth and Ratnam.

He earned 32 caps for Sri Lanka between 2001 and 2009, scoring two goals.

Coaching career
Steinwall was appointed coach of Sri Lanka in April 2016 succeeding Sampath Perera.

References

1974 births
Living people
Sri Lankan footballers
Sri Lanka international footballers
Renown SC players
Club Valencia players
Blue Star SC players
Negambo Youth players
Ratnam SC players
Association football defenders
Sri Lankan expatriate footballers
Sri Lankan expatriate sportspeople in the Maldives
Expatriate footballers in the Maldives
Sri Lanka Football Premier League players